Andaqui (or Andaki) is an extinct language from the southern highlands of Colombia. It has been linked to the Paezan or Barbacoan languages, but no connections have been demonstrated. It was spoken by the Andaqui people of Colombia.

Language contact
Jolkesky (2016) notes that there are lexical similarities with Paez, Chibcha (also proposed by Rivet 1924), and Tinigua-Pamigua due to contact.

Varieties
Other unattested varieties possibly related to Andaqui that are listed by Loukotka (1968):

Timaná - once spoken on the Magdalena River and Guarapas River around the city of Timaná.
Yalcon / Cambi - once spoken between the Magdalena River and La Plata River.

Vocabulary
Loukotka (1968) lists the following basic vocabulary items.

{| class="wikitable sortable"
! gloss !! Andaquí
|-
| one || guhigo
|-
| two || nashihishe
|-
| ear || sun-guaxo
|-
| tongue || shonaé
|-
| hand || sakaá
|-
| foot || soguapaná
|-
| water || xixi
|-
| stone || guatihi
|-
| maize || kike
|-
| fish || nengihi
|-
| house || kogo
|}

See also
Macro-Paesan languages

Further reading
Coronas Urzúa, G. (1994). Análisis Fonológico de la lengua Andaquí. Revista de Filología y Lingüística de la Universidad de Costa Rica, 20:69-98.
Coronas Urzúa, G. (1995). El lexico de la lengua andaquí. Revista de Filología y Lingüística de la Universidad de Costa Rica, 21:79-113.

References

External links

El léxico de la lengua Andaquí (PDF)

Indigenous languages of South America
Extinct languages of South America
Language isolates of South America
Macro-Paesan languages